Finkley is a hamlet in the Test Valley district of Hampshire, England. The nearest town is Andover, which lies approximately 2.8 miles (4.2 km) south-west from the hamlet. At the 2011 Census the population was included in the civil parish of Smannell.

Villages in Hampshire
Test Valley